"Fallen Angel" is a composition by English progressive rock band King Crimson. It is the second track on their seventh studio album, Red, released on 6 October 1974.

The lyrics are a man's lament over the tragedy of his young brother, who joined a gang and was stabbed to death on the streets of New York City, sung with deep pathos by John Wetton.

The motif used in Fallen Angel is an arpeggio by Robert Fripp, part of an improvisation performed by five members during the recording of Larks' Tongues in Aspic in 1972. Guest musicians Mark Charig cornet and Robin Miller oboe appear during select musical passages. Mark Charig and Robin Miller also played on the albums Lizard (1970) and Islands (1971).

It was the last of King Crimson's studio albums to include acoustic guitar played by Robert Fripp.
This is also the last time the acoustic guitar appears on a studio-recorded song, with the exception of an acoustic version of 'Eyes Wide Open' (performed by Adrian Belew) on the 2002 mini-album Happy with What You Have to Be Happy With.

The band had never performed the song live since the time it was released on album, but it was finally performed live in Chicago in 2017.

Personnel
Robert Fripp – guitar, Mellotron
John Wetton – vocals, bass
Bill Bruford – drums, percussion

with:

Mark Charig – cornet
Robin Miller – oboe
uncredited – cello

References 

1970s ballads
King Crimson songs
1974 songs
Rock ballads
Songs written by Bill Bruford
Songs written by Robert Fripp
Songs written by John Wetton
Songs written by Richard Palmer-James
British progressive rock songs
Songs about death